Magway, Magwe or Magwi may refer to:

Places

Myanmar
Magway, Myanmar, the capital city of Magway Division of Myanmar
Magway Region (also spelled Magwe Division, formerly Magway Division
Magway District in Magway Division
Magway Township in Magway District
Magway University in Magwe, Burma
Magwe F.C., a football team from Magway

South Sudan
Magwi County, or Magwe County, a county in South Sudan 
Magwi, the seat of Magwi county

Companies
Magway Ltd, a transportation technology company